Proto-Bopper is an album by pianist Joe Albany recorded in 1972 and released on the Revelation label in the US and on Spotlite in the UK.

Reception 

Allmusic's Scott Yanow said: "Despite an out-of-tune piano on a few of the songs, this is a worthy and historical set".

Track listing 
 "When Lights Are Low" (Benny Carter) – 5:00
 "Our Love Affair Is Over" (Joe Albany, Bob Whitlock) – 5:00
 "You Don't Know What Love Is" (Gene de Paul, Don Raye) – 3:30
 "For Heaven's Sake" (Elise Bretton, Sherman Edwards, Donald Meyer) – 2:30
 "Gettin' Sentimental Over You" (George Bassman, Ned Washington) – 5:10
 "Yardbird Suite" (Charlie Parker) – 3:56
 "Imagination" (Jimmy Van Heusen, Johnny Burke) – 3:30
 "Like Someone in Love" (Van Heusen, Burke) – 2:50
 "C.C. Rider" (Traditional) – 4:33
 "You're Blasé" (Ord Hamilton, Bruce Sievier) – 3:15
 "Suddenly, It's Spring" (Victor Young) – 3:00

Personnel 
Joe Albany – piano
Bob Whitlock – bass (tracks 1, 2, 5, 6, 9 & 10)
Nick Martinis (track 10), Jerry McKenzie (tracks 1, 2, 5, 6 & 9) – drums

References 

Joe Albany albums
1972 albums
Spotlite Records albums
Revelation Records (jazz) albums